San Pedro del Pinatar is a small town and municipality in the Region of Murcia, southeastern Spain. The municipality is situated at the northern end of Murcia's Mediterranean coastline, the Costa Cálida, and borders the province of Alicante. It has an area of almost 22 km2, and a population of 25,167 as of 2018.

History 
San Pedro became an industrial territory whose salt mines were used by the Romans. They utilised the salt to produce an ancient Roman sauce called garum.

In 711 CE, Muslim civilizations started conquering the Iberian Peninsula. A few years later they dominated a great part of it, including the current San Pedro del Pinatar.

In 1243, the king Muhammad Ibn Hud offered vassalage to the Crown of Castile. In April of that year, the Treaty of Alcaraz, in which the sovereignty of Castile was recognised, was signed. As a result, all the former Taifa of Murcia went under Castile's rule.

San Pedro del Pinatar was part of the Crown of Castile but it was next to the Crown of Aragon. A border which crossed Campo de Cartagena (a region that is categorised as a comarca) and ended in San Pedro was decided in 1305.

A book was written in 1340 called ; the aspect of the current municipality in the Late Middle Ages is described in that work. It was written that the territory was a dense forest mass where wild boar were hunted.

San Pedro del Pinatar's population increased in the late years of the Middle Ages due to the arrival of families.

The localities of the municipality were set up in the beginning of the early modern period. The salt mines were utilised by the lessees who held rights on the mines at a similar level to the Crown. The institution awarded shares to these lessees in order to regain the power on the mines. The convenient access to the coastal salty lagoon  of Mar Menor allowed Berber pirates to easily disembark, destroy the region and take the loot. Typical Spanish coastal watchtowers were built along the coast. Philip II of Spain wrote a letter, in which he announced his intention to set up a tower, on 6 June 1592 in order to set up a defence system for the region. The tower was built in 1602, and it was armed with artillery and manned until the 18th century.

From 1700 to 1713 the War of the Spanish Succession occurred. People in Reino of Murcia (an administrative division belonging to the Crown of Castile whose status was similar to an ordinary kingdom) allied with Philip V of Spain. The supporters of the Charles VI, Holy Roman Emperor, attacked Cartagena, its port and the region related to Mar Menor in 1706.

During the last years of the early modern period, there were fewer privateer attacks; as a result, there was an economic rise and an increase in population. The municipal registers, in regards to population, stated that the number of inhabitants doubled in the last years of the 18th century (1771–1798).

In 1829 there was an earthquake in San Pedro del Pinatar. In the 19th century there was a cholera epidemic in the region, but San Pedro was unaffected.

During the Trienio Liberal (1820–1823) and taking advantage of the just-arrived liberalism, the people formed a local government, but after 1823, when the political system corresponding to the previous politic regime was instituted, the local government was eliminated and the territory became part of the municipality of Murcia again. After the death of Ferdinand VII of Spain, liberalism was reestablished. In the context of this situation, San Pedro achieved its own local government again on 16 September 1836.

Coastal customs were set in San Pedro del Pinatar in 1857. In 1869, a law which eliminated the monopoly of the salty mines was presented.

The inhabitants of the municipality relied on fishing and agriculture for their economy. Land-related activity was hindered because of a lack of lands and drought. There were attempts to attenuate these obstacles that consisted of lifting the water by waterwheels and water mills.

The salt mines were among the main economic sources. Some of them were built to decant the water from Mar Menor, and a few are preserved today.

In the 1960s tourism to the municipality increased and led to a rise in economy, and the appearance of construction and service-related jobs. There was an increase in population resulting from the improve of standard of living; in 1971 there were 6,637 people living in San Pedro, and 20 years after the town's population consisted of 13,000 inhabitants.

Demography and administrative divisions 
The 24,093 inhabitants of San Pedro del Pinatar are distributed in the following districts:

 San Pedro del Pinatar: 10,491
 Lo Pagán: 2,907
 Los Peñascos: 1,594
 Los Sáez: 1,499
 Las Esperanzas: 1,454
 Los Antolinos: 1,238
 Loma de Abajo: 786
 Los Tárragas: 750
 Los Imbernones: 329
 El Mojón: 236
 Los Veras: 211
 Loma de Arriba: 192
 Las Beatas: 104
 Los Gómez: 79
 Las Pachecas: 37
 Las Salinas: 5

Others links 
 Salinas y Arenales de San Pedro del Pinatar

References

External links 

 Local Government website  
San Pedro del Pinatar
Lo Pagan coastal neighborhood of San Pedro

Municipalities in the Region of Murcia